Edmund Waller (1606–1687) was an English poet and politician.

Edmund Waller may also refer to:

Edmund Waller (1652–1700), MP for Amersham
Edmund Waller (died 1771), MP for Great Marlow and Wycombe
Edmund Waller (1725–1788), MP for Wycombe
Edmund Waller (cricketer), English cricketer and British Army officer
Sir Edmund Waller, 4th Baronet

See also
Waller family (Kent)
Waller baronets